Arbion Balilaj (born 27 July 2000) is an Albanian footballer who plays as a forward for Flamurtari in the Kategoria e Parë.

Career

Flamurtari
A graduate of the club's youth academy, Balilaj made his competitive debut for the club on 18 September 2019, coming on as a 63rd-minute substitute for Jurgen Vrapi in a 3-2 Cup defeat to Veleçiku.

References

External links

2000 births
Living people
Flamurtari Vlorë players
Kategoria Superiore players
Association football forwards
Footballers from Vlorë
Albanian footballers